The FVM J 23 was a Swedish single seat, single engine, parasol wing fighter aircraft built in the mid-1920s. Five were flown but the type never reached operational status because of structural concerns raised by a fatal accident.

Design and development
The parasol wing of the J 23 had a thick airfoil section, a straight leading edge and a trailing edge which curved forwards to elliptical tips. In the central region the wing became thinner and the chord decreased in front of the cockpit. These were angled, fabric covered and small but slotted to improve their efficiency. Parallel pairs of airfoil section flying struts ran on each side from the lower fuselage to the wing spars at about one third span. Over the fuselage a pair of N-form cabane struts leaned inwards to meet at the wing's centre.

Like the wing, the fuselage and empennage of the J 23 were wooden  structures. The elliptical cross section fuselage consisted of pre-shaped, stress bearing plywood panels around a light framework of frames and stringers. The pilot's open cockpit was just aft of the trailing edge, from where he could see both over the wing and through the narrow gap between wing and fuselage. The six cylinder BMW IIIa engine had a fixed pair of machine gun over it in the forward fuselage and its honeycomb radiator was in the nose, with the propeller shaft set low. This was a high compression engine which could only develop full power at altitude, enabling the J 23 to fly high and fast. The  m/22  were synchronized, firing through the propeller. At the rear the ply covered fin was surprisingly small and low, though the fabric covered rudder extended down to the keel. The rudder carried a trim tab. The J 23's cantilever, low aspect ratio, D-shaped, ply covered tailplane was mounted on top of the fuselage, carrying balanced elevators with cut outs for rudder movement.

Its fixed undercarriage had mainwheels on a rigid axle, rubber sprung from the crosspiece between two tall V-form legs mounted on the fuselage at the same points as the interplane struts.  The axle and crosspiece were enclosed within an airfoil section fairing, which provided some additional lift.

The J 23 first flew in June 1923 and was tail heavy, a fault rectified by an increase in length  (several sources, e.g. put the length at about  but L'Aérophile, a year after the first flight, gives ). By July five examples had been built and all appeared at the Gothenburg International Aero Show late in that month. Military testing proceeded until 15 March 1924, when there was a fatal, structural wing failure on one J 23. Though work on the aircraft continued and some modifications like an increase in tail area were made, the J 23 was thereafter seen as too fragile for service use.

Work had also been proceeding on the J 24, similar to the J 23 but with a much more powerful  Hispano-Suiza 8F V-8 engine.  Following the J 23 accident, the sole J 24 was converted into a single bay biplane designated the J 24B. It was flown in 1925 but, overweight, its performance was not good enough to interest the military.

Variants
Data from Green and Swanborough p. 235
J 23 Five BMW powered aircraft, first modified then scrapped after the March 1924 accident.
J 24Similar to the J 23 but with a more powerful,  Hispano-Suiza 8F V-8. One only.
J 24BThe J .24 rebuilt after the March 1924 J 23 accident as a biplane. One only, flown in 1925.

Specifications

References

Bibliography

Parasol-wing aircraft
1920s Swedish fighter aircraft
Single-engined tractor aircraft
Aircraft first flown in 1923